Story or stories may refer to:

Common uses
 Story, a narrative (an account of imaginary or real people and events)
 Short story, a piece of prose fiction that typically can be read in one sitting
 Story (American English), or storey (British English), a floor or level of a building
 News story, an event or topic reported by a news organization

Social media
Stories (social media), a collection of messages, images or videos, often ephemeral
 Facebook Stories, short user-generated photo or video collections that can be uploaded to the user's Facebook
 Instagram Stories, a feature in Instagram that let the user post vertical images that will disappear in 24 hours
 Snapchat Stories, a feature in Snapchat which allows users to compile snaps into chronological storylines, accessible to all of their friends

Film, television and radio
 Story Television, an American digital broadcast television network
 Story TV, a South Korean television drama production company
 Story (TV programme), a 2015–2016 New Zealand television programme
 Story, one of the main characters in the 2006 film Lady in the Water
 The Story (film documentary short), a 2000 short film by John Little
 The Story with Dick Gordon, a radio interview program that debuted in 2006
 "Stories", an episode of The Good Doctor

Music

Groups
 The Story (American band), a 1989–1994 folk-rock duo
 The Story (British band), an English psychedelic folk duo formed in 2002
 Stories (band), a 1972–1974 American rock group

Albums
 Story (Amorphis album), 2000
 Story (Eric Clapton album), 1991
 Story: 25 Years of Hits, by Pet Shop Boys, 2009
 Story, by Honeybus, 1970
 Story, by NEWS, 2020
 Story, by Yesung, 2019
 A Story, by Yoko Ono (recorded 1974), or the title song, 1997
 The Story (Brandi Carlile album) or the title song (see below), 2007
 The Story (Kang Daniel album) or the title song, 2022
 The Story (Runrig album) or the title song, 2016
 The Story: The Very Best of Spandau Ballet, 2014
 The Story, by Bizzy Bone, 2006
 Stories (Addison Road album), 2010
 Stories (Avicii album), 2015
 Stories (The Bunny the Bear album), 2013
 Stories (Gloria Gaynor album), 1980
 Stories (Mayumi Iizuka album) or the title song, 2008
 Stories (Milford Graves album), 2000
 Stories (Randy Stonehill album), 1993
 Stories (EP), by Chris Brokaw, or the title song, 2011
 Stories, an EP by Aurora, 2021
 Stories, by John Mayall & the Bluesbreakers, 2002
 Stories, by various artists, released by Narada Productions

Songs
 "Story" (Ai song), 2005
 "Story" (Rina Aiuchi song), 2009
 "Story", by Drake White from Spark, 2016
 "Story", by Leddra Chapman from Telling Tales, 2009
 "Story", by Maroon 5, a B-side of "Makes Me Wonder", 2007
 "Story", by NF from Clouds (The Mixtape), 2021
 "Story", by P-Square from Get Squared, 2005
 "Story", by Perfume from Cosmic Explorer, 2016
 "The Story" (Brandi Carlile song), 2007
 "The Story" (Conan Gray song), 2020
 "The Story", by 30 Seconds to Mars from A Beautiful Lie, 2005
 "The Story", by Derrick Morgan
 "The Story", by Jewel, representing Alaska in the American Song Contest, 2022
 "The Story", by Limp Bizkit from The Unquestionable Truth (Part 1), 2005
 "The Story", by M.I.A. from AIM, 2016
 "The Story", by the Passions from Sanctuary, 2019 reissue
 "Stories" (Boney M. song), 1990
 "Stories" (Therapy? song), 1995
 "Stories", by Paige O'Hara from Beauty and the Beast: The Enchanted Christmas, 1997
 "Stories", by Saint Motel from Voyeur, 2012
 "Stories", by Trapt from Trapt, 2002

Places

Australia
 Story Bridge, Brisbane, Queensland

United States
 Story, Arkansas, an unincorporated community
 Story, Indiana, an unincorporated community
 Story, Nebraska, an unincorporated community
 Story, Wyoming, a census-designated place
 Joint Expeditionary Base Fort Story, an army base in Virginia Beach, Virginia
 Story City, Iowa
 Story County, Iowa

People
 Story (surname)
 Story Musgrave (born 1935), American doctor and astronaut
 Story Tweedie-Yates (born 1983), professional American tennis player

Other uses
 Story (magazine), an American literary magazine published 1931–1961 and 1989–2000
 Story: Substance, Structure, Style and the Principles of Screenwriting, a 1997 screenwriting guide by Robert McKee
 The Stories, by Jane Gardam, 2014
 User story, a planning activity in software development
 Ray-Ban Stories, smartglasses released in September 2021

See also
 History (disambiguation)
 Storey (disambiguation)